The Method to Our Madness is the third studio album by the English/American rock band The Lords of the New Church, released in November 1984 by I.R.S. Records. It is also the last studio album to feature the band's original line up of Stiv Bators, Brian James, Dave Tregunna and Nick Turner. The album peaked at #158 on the US Billboard 200.

For the 1985 US release, the album was remixed and strings were added to "When Blood Runs Cold". The US version omitted "Fresh Flesh" and replaced it with "S.F. & T.", the B-side of the "Murder Style" 12" single.

Background 

In 1985, singer Stiv Bators spoke on the album's musical direction, saying: "When we first got together it was a nice mixture of our different personalities. We didn't know what we were supposed to sound like, so we more or less discovered ourselves. On the second album we discovered various different styles we could do, but not in a unified direction. Now we have finally settled in a direction."

Initially, the band felt very stimulated playing, writing and recording together. Their first two selfproduced albums went "really, really well," according to guitarist Brian James, but Method to Our Madness was more of a struggle. Furthermore, the band's record company, I.R.S., wanted to use an outside producer, because the band was "losing its dynamic a bit," said James in 2007.

The Method to Our Madness was produced by Chris Tsangarides, who had previously worked with hard rock acts like Thin Lizzy, Gary Moore and Tygers of Pan Tang. The album features, among others; French jazz pianist Jacques Loussier, at whose Miraval Studios parts of the album was recorded; former Manfred Mann member Mike Hugg on keyboards; and the Lords' longtime session and touring keyboardist Matt Irving from Manfred Mann's Earth Band. The Lords' manager and label boss, Miles Copeland, makes a cameo appearance on "Method to My Madness" with a few spoken lines.

Critical reception 

AllMusic's Bill Cassel wrote that The Method to Our Madness sounds more like a debut album, with the band "bursting with energy" and with a much rawer production than on their first two albums. He noted that "the aggression level stays pretty high, dipping only for a couple of ballads." Ira Robbins of Trouser Press described the album as a cross between The Stooges' Raw Power and Billy Idol's Rebel Yell. He called it "the band's least distinctive - but most popular-sounding - record." In his Encyclopedia of Popular Music, Colin Larkin felt that the album "revealed a band treading water with stifled heavy rock routines."

Track listing

Chart positions

Personnel 
Credits adapted from the album's liner notes.
The Lords of the New Church

Stiv Bators – vocals
Brian James – guitar
Dave Tregunna – bass, vocals
Nick Turner – drums, percussion, vocals

Additional musicians

Matt Irving – keyboards
Chris Tsangarides – keyboards 
Mike Hugg – keyboards 
Jacques Loussier – piano
Vicki Brown – vocals
Samantha Brown – vocals
Helen Chappelle – vocals
Tricia Ronane – vocals
Paola Pieroni – vocals
Tanya Landau – vocals 
Miles Copeland – voice on "Method to My Madness"
Hein Hoven – string arrangements on US version of "When Blood Runs Cold"

Technical

Chris Tsangarides – production 
Andy Warwick – production assistance
Sheila Rock – photography
Graphyk – design

References 

1984 albums
Albums produced by Chris Tsangarides
The Lords of the New Church albums
I.R.S. Records albums